The I Have a Dream Foundation (IHAD) is a charitable trust that was founded in 1981 by businessman Eugene Lang. Its aim is to motivate and empower children from low-income communities to reach their education and career goals by providing a long-term programme of mentoring, tutoring and enrichment, along with tuition assistance for higher education. This organization aims to lessen high school drop out rate by providing educational opportunities, recreational programmes, social support and financial resources that they might otherwise be denied.

History 
In 1981, Eugene Lang began the first "I Have a Dream" Project for students at Public School No. 121 in East Harlem, New York City a school he had attended 50 years earlier.
In 2003, Scott and Mary Gilmour start the first "I Have a Dream" project outside of the US Scott learned about IHAD while living in Portland, Oregon, for 15 years in the 1980s and 1990s, and carried the dream when he returned home. The IHAD Charitable Trust began with a Year 4 class at Wesley Primary School, a Decile 1 school in Mt Roskill, Auckland, New Zealand.

References

External links 
  
  I Have a Dream- New Zealand website
  "I Have a Dream" Foundation – USA Website
  "I Have a Dream"- Metro New York Website

Organizations established in 1981
Educational organisations based in New Zealand
Charities based in New Zealand
Charities based in New York (state)
International nongovernmental youth organizations